Zappa '88: The Last U.S. Show is a live album released June 18, 2021, by Frank Zappa. It contains mostly previously unreleased recordings of the last concert he would ever play in the US at the Nassau Coliseum in Uniondale, New York.

Content
The album was released as a double CD and a quadruple LP. The album also has a couple covers such as "Stairway to Heaven", "Whipping Post", and a medley of Beatles songs consisting of "Norwegian Wood (This Bird Has Flown)", "Lucy in the Sky with Diamonds", and "Strawberry Fields Forever" with changed lyrics to reflect a recent sex-scandal with Televangelist Jimmy Swaggart as well as a standalone cover of "I Am the Walrus".  There were also two new songs written and recorded for the tour, "Jesus Thinks You’re A Jerk” and “When The Lie’s So Big”. The opening track "We Are Doing Voter Registration Here" shows Frank Zappa encouraging everyone to go and vote for the upcoming election and showed someone registering on stage.

Track listing

Personnel

 Frank Zappa - lead guitar, Synclavier, vocals
 Mike Keneally - guitar, synth, vocals
 Scott Thunes - electric bass, Minimoog
 Ike Willis - rhythm guitar, synth, vocals
 Chad Wackerman - drums, electronic percussion
 Ed Mann - Vibraphone, Marimba, electronic percussion
 Robert Martin - keyboards, vocals
 Walt Fowler - Trumpet, Flugelhorn, synth
 Bruce Fowler - Trombone
 Paul Carman - Alto, Soprano, Baritone
 Albert Wing - Tenor saxophone
 Kurt McGettrick - Baritone, Bass saxophone

Charts

References

2021 live albums
Frank Zappa live albums